George Hayes (13 November 1888 – 13 July 1967) was a British stage, television and film actor.

He appeared in the wartime West End musical The Lisbon Story at the London Hippodrome.

Partial filmography

 Hamlet (1913) - Osric
 Emil and the Detectives (1935) - The Man In The Bowler Hat - Sam Pinker
 Inside the Room (1935) - Henry Otisse
 Old Roses (1935) - Simes
 The Guv'nor (1935) - Dubois
 Wolf's Clothing (1936) - Yassiov
 Everything Is Thunder (1936) - Minor Role (uncredited)
 Land Without Music (1936) - Strozzi
 Death Croons the Blues (1937) - Hugo Branker
 Break the News (1938) - President of the Tribunal
 Strange Boarders (1938) - (uncredited)
 No Parking (1938) - James Selby
 Return of the Frog (1938) - Dandy Lane
 Life of St. Paul (1938) - Nero
 The Mind of Mr. Reeder (1939) - Brady
 Secret Journey (1939) - Insp. Walter
 Come on George! (1939) - Bannerman
 Spy for a Day (1940) - Cpl. Boehme
 The Case of the Frightened Lady (1940) - Brooks
 Freedom Radio (1941) - Policeman
 East of Piccadilly (1941) - Mark Struberg
 Great Expectations (1946) - Convict
 Esther Waters (1948) - Journeyman
 For Them That Trespass (1949) - The Mad Artist

References

Bibliography
 Goble, Alan. The Complete Index to Literary Sources in Film. Walter de Gruyter, 1999.

External links

1888 births
1967 deaths
British male stage actors
British male film actors
British male television actors
Male actors from London